Jodi Jill (born January 29, 1971) is an author best known for having been raised in a public storage facility.

Early life
Jill was born in Albert Lea, Minnesota.   In 1980, when she was nine years old, she, her parents, and her younger sister relocated to Loveland, Colorado, where the family moved into a 10-by-20-foot storage unit at Loveland Self Storage. Because the facility barred people from living in the units, Jill’s parents avoided suspicion by refusing to let the children out during the day, even to attend school, and forbade them from speaking to people outside the family. Neither Jill nor her siblings were ever enrolled in school.

The storage unit would remain Jill and her family’s residence for the next 13 years, during which time her parents had three more children.

A feature article about Jill in Marie Claire described the family’s “bizarre” living arrangement:
With wood pilfered from construction sites, (Jill’s father) built a sleeping loft. For a toilet, everyone used the same bucket, emptied only once a day in a nearby ditch; to bathe, they filled another bucket from a spigot in the parking lot. A propane heater kept the temperature just above freezing.

Writing career
Jill is the author of Tours for Free California and Tours for Free: Colorado. In 2004, Los Angeles Magazine called Tours for Free California the year’s “Best Offbeat Guide to L.A.”

References 

American women writers
Homeless people
Living people
1971 births
People from Albert Lea, Minnesota
People from Loveland, Colorado
Writers from Colorado
21st-century American women